Formosa Airlines Flight 7623 was a domestic flight from Hsinchu to Kaohsiung. It crashed into the ocean shortly after take-off in a severe right bank.

Aircraft 
B-12255 was a Saab 340B. It had its first flight in 1993, and had since then accumulated 8,076 flight hours.

Crew
The captain had 10,900 flight hours, 6,400 being on the Saab 340.

The first officer had only 300 flight hours, being hired on February 25.

Flight
During pre-flight checks, a failure of the right-hand main bus was noticed, which caused the following systems to be unavailable: the left-hand electronic flight instrument system (EFIS), the EFIS Comparators, LH/RH Flight Directors, LH RMI, autopilot, yaw-damper and others. Also the No. 2 engine anti-ice start-bleed valve was left open because of this, which caused its ITT to be 15 °C higher than normal on that power. According to the Minimum Equipment List (MEL), take-off with a Main Bus offline was prohibited, but the flight took off from runway 05 at 19:29 anyway. Due to the autopilot failure, the plane had to be flown manually. Since the yaw-damper also failed, rudder inputs would have been required, but they weren't made. The more than 30 °C ITT split between engines had a little effect on the aircraft, but only when the crew reduced power on the No. 2 engine, 30 seconds later, probably to reduce the ITT. This caused the No. 2 engine to have 13% less torque, leading to rolling and yawing to the right, which required constant left aileron. The flaps, which were supposed to be retracted at 1,000 feet, weren't retracted until the plane almost reached the maximum allowed speed with flaps deployed. When the climb power was set, a symmetric Power Lever Angle (PLA) change was made. However, due to the earlier RH PLA pull in combination with the normal backlash in the power lever cables between the PLA and the Hydro-Mechanical Unit (HMU), the RH engine torque was decreased while the LH engine torque remained unchanged. This resulted in an even greater asymmetry. The aircraft started to turn to the right, and the rate of climb started decreasing. The co-pilot transmitted to ATC: "Left 230, Bravo 12255", while the plane was at 21° degrees of right bank. 10 seconds later, the captain asked for assistance with his heading, during which the plane was in a 10° nose-up pitch and 24° right bank, which increased by one every second. After the captain said "Ask for radar vectors" he also made a small right aileron input, worsening the bank. At the last moments of the flight, right aileron commands were inputted, and the aircraft, 161 seconds after take-off, crashed into the ocean, pitched down 65°. None of the 13 occupants survived.<ref name="baaa"<ref name="ASN"

Investigation
The RH Main Bus failure meant that the airplane couldn't take off according to the MEL. However the pilots ignored this. The flight taking place at night in Instrument Meteorological Conditions (IMC), pilot fatigue (the captain was on duty for more than 11 hours), and system failures probably contributed to the loss of situational awareness and spatial disorientation, which caused the aircraft to bank further and further to the right. The crew also failed to follow standard operating procedures.<ref name="baaa"<ref name="ASN"

See also
Crossair Flight 498
Kenya Airways Flight 507
Adam Air Flight 574

References

Aviation accidents and incidents in 1998
Aviation accidents and incidents in Taiwan
1998 in Taiwan
Airliner accidents and incidents caused by pilot error
Airliner accidents and incidents caused by electrical failure
Accidents and incidents involving the Saab 340
March 1998 events in Asia
1998 disasters in Taiwan